The Mitsubishi XFC is a compact crossover SUV concept that was first shown on October 19 in Ho Chi Minh City and then at the 2022 Vietnam Motor Show on October 26. The production version of the XFC is expected to arrive in spring 2023 in ASEAN markets, including Vietnam.

It will be a standalone model, meaning it would not replace an existing spot in the range and will serve as a new addition.

References

XFC
XFC